Dirk Pilaet (born March 20, 1962, Wilrijk, Antwerp, Belgium), known professionally as Brian Clifton, is a Belgian musician, composer and orchestrator. He composed the music for over 30 films and television series, including De Kollega's Maken de Brug! (1988),  the VRT series Alfa Papa Tango (1990-1991), the American movies Bird of Prey (1995) featuring Richard Chamberlain and Philippe Mora's Back in Business (1997), Ellektra (2004) starring Matthias Schoenaerts and Axelle Red, and Spike and Suzy: The Dark Diamond (2004).

Brian Clifton has been associated with film directors such as Vincent Rouffaer, Robbe De Hert and Nnegest Likké. Clifton is also known for composing the hymn for the Belgian First Division A, the top league competition for association football clubs in Belgium, TV commercials for ICI Paris XL and Christian Dior, and the End Titles for the 2005 Thai historical drama film The King Maker.

In recent years, he became a steady guest-lecturer at the Brussels film school RITCS-School of Arts.

Selected works

Music for movies and series 

 De Dwaling (1987) (mini) TV Series 
 Het Ultieme kerstverhaal (1987) by Vincent Rouffaer
 A Three-Day Weekend (1988)
 Hoogtevrees (1988) by Vincent Rouffaer 
 Sarah? Sarah (1989) by Jan Keymeulen
 Trouble in Paradise (1989) by Robbe De Hert 
 Alfa Papa Tango (1990) TV Series by Vincent Rouffaer
 De Leraarskamer (1991) by Vincent Rouffaer
 Less Dead Than the Others (1992) by Frans Buyens
 De Ware vrienden (1993) TV Series by Vincent Rouffaer
 Over the Rainbow (1995) by Rudolf Mestdagh
 Bird of Prey (1995) by Temístocles López
 Bayou Ghost (1997) by Gardner Compton
 Back in Business - Heart of Stone (1997)
 Tot mijn laatste adem (2000) 
 Hollywood aan de Schelde - part 1 (2001) TV Series by Robbe De Hert
 Saturday Night Fear (2001) by Jeroen Dumoulein
 Hollywood aan de Schelde - part 2 (2004) TV Series by Robbe De Hert
 Sprookjes (2004) TV Series 
 Spike and Suzy: The Dark Diamond (2004) by Rudi van den Bossche
 Ellekra (2004) by Rudolf Mestdagh - Best Film Music Nomination at Syracuse Film Festival
 WaWa (2005) TV Series 
 The King Maker (2005)
 Badoir (2005) by Diego Deceuninck
 Droomtijd (2006) 
 Ghajaana (2006)
 Blinker en de blixvaten (2008) by Filip Van Neyghem
 Bobby en de Geestenjagers (2013) by Martin Lagestee 
 Bingo (2013) by Rudi Van Den Bossche 
 Andromeda (2013)
 Speculum (2014)
 I Wish My Life (2014)
 Echo (2015)
 Everything But a Man (2017) by Nnegest Likké

Music for musicals 
 De Plattegrond van het Moeras by Lulu Aertgeerts
 The Holiday Love Show by Lulu Aertgeerts
 Malus by Brian Clifton
 Prins Blauwert (of Marc De Bel) by Vincent Rouffaer

References

External links 
 Official site
 

1962 births
Living people
20th-century classical composers
Belgian composers
Male composers
21st-century classical composers
Belgian film score composers
People from Wilrijk
20th-century Belgian male musicians
21st-century male musicians